Curt Faudon (10 May 1949 - 25 July 2019) was an Austrian film director who wrote, produced and directed over 30 films. He received First Prizes and Jury Awards at Film Festivals in Cannes, Berlin, Monte Carlo, Chicago, New York, and Sydney.

Faudon was born in Graz in 1949, and moved to New York City in 1979. His films, in a style all of their own, show a keen eye for detail, colour and light. Faudon's son, Patrick Faudon, is a film producer.

Films  

 Magic Graz (1972); writer/director
 Hugo Wolf (1976) director; documentary starring Oskar Werner as Hugo Wolf; ORF, ZDF
 George Orwell (1984) director; documentary on George Orwell; written by Hilde Spiel; ORF, ZDF, RAI, SRG
 Good News from Austria (1984) director; documentary on the Austrian economy
 Fanny von Arnstein (1985) director; feature based on the book by Hilde Spiel; ORF, ARD
 Christmas with Willi (1985) writer/director; feature, ORF, ZDF
 Auf dem Schnee ein Feuer (1986/87) writer/director; documentary; ORF, ZDF
 Land der Täler, parts 1-10 (1989–1991) director; documentary; ORF
 Top Spot, parts 1-3 (1989–1991) TV show; writer/director/producer; with Désirée Nosbusch, Philip Michael Thomas, Shirley Bassey
 Melting Pot of Illusions, parts 1&2 (1992) writer/director; TV documentary on the USA 500 years after Christopher Columbus, PBS channel 13
 Mount of Olives (1990) director; TV documentary; ORF, PBS
 Loaves and Fishes (1991) director; TV documentary; ORF, PBS
 Nothing but reality (1989) director; documentary based on the book by Hilde Spiel; ORF, ZDF, PBS
 Die verweigerte Zärtlichkeit (1986) director; feature film based on the book by H. Fink; ORF
 Cross Town Sabbath/Zwang zur Unrast (1994/95) writer/director/producer; docudrama based on the book by Frederic Morton, ORF, PBS, Channel 13
 Total Relaunch of TV News Station n-tv/CNN writer/director/producer; 1997 in Berlin
  (1997/1998) Writer/Director; feature film starring Rupert Frazer, Francois-Eric Gendron, Alexander Peskov, Thomas Heinze, Jerry Cala; Sat.1, BAVARIA, ORF
 Flames of Hell (1999) co-author/Director; feature film starring Heino Ferch, Natalia Wörner, Axel Milberg: Kirch Group, SAT 1, ORF
 Trivial Pursuit (2000) co-author/Director; feature film starring Tobias Moretti, Jule Ronstedt, Thomas Heinze, SAT 1
 Tattoo (2000) co-author/Director; feature film starring Tobias Moretti, Katja Weitzenboeck, Ben Sadler, Gudrun Landgrebe, Erwin Steinhauer: Sat.1, Kirch Group, ORF, Vienna Film Commission
 Universum Steirische Toskana (2000) Writer/Director/Producer; documentary; ORF
 Universum Tirol - Leben im Bergland (2001) Writer/Director/Producer; documentary; ORF, Faudon Movies
 Universum Carinthia - Leben am Wasser (2002/2003) Writer/Director/Producer; documentary; ORF-Cine, Culture Carinthia, Faudon Movies, WDR
 Szczesny - The Film (2003/2004) Writer/Director/Producer; documentary on Stefan Szczesny
 Commercials Österreich Werbung
 Discover the Joy - Austria (2002/2003); commercial. Won first prize at the film festivals in New York, Los Angeles, Karlsbad, at the 2003 ITB Berlin, and the Grand Prix CITF for best commercial
  (2004) co-author/Director; feature film starring Ken Duken, Sebastian Koch, Eva Hassmann, August Schmoelzer, Rosie Alvarez; EPO Film, ORF, Towers Production London, Cine Carinthia
 Universum New York Central Park (2004/2005) Writer/Director/Producer; documentary; ORF, WDR, Faudon Movies
 "Silk Road - Songs Along the Road and Time" (2007/2008) film about the Vienna Boys' Choir - Director
 The End of Something. Ernest Hemingway co-author/Director; in production

Awards
1972, Cannes Film Festival: nomination, Palme d'Or, best short film (Magic Graz)
2002, New York Festivals, International Film and Video Competition: Finalist (Snowdance in Austria: Discover the Joy)
2002, ITB Berlin: First Prize (Discover the Joy)
2002, CIFFT - Comité International des Festivals du Film Touristique Grand Prix, Best Commercial World Wide (Discover the Joy)
2005, US International Film and Video Festival, Los Angeles: Golden Camera Award (Mozart)
2007, US International Film and Video Festival, Los Angeles: Certificate for Creative Excellence (Sailing Island)
2007, ITB Berlin: First Prize (Vienna Collection)
2007, CIFFT - Comité International des Festivals du Film Touristique Grand Prix, Best Commercial World Wide (Vienna Collection)
2007, US International Film and Video Festival, Los Angeles: Silver Screen Award (Vienna Collection)
2007, New York Festivals, International Film and Video Competition: Bronze World Medal (Sailing Island)

References
 TV WEEKEND; On a Manhattan Bus Ride, a Trip to the Past

External links
 official site
 

Austrian film directors
German-language film directors
1949 births
2019 deaths